Paul Corkett is a British record producer, engineer and arranger.

Biography
Paul got his start as an engineer in the mid-1980s, engineering singles and albums for bands as varied as ABC, the Chameleons, Twelfth Night and the Heart Throbs. He landed his first big engineering gig in 1992, recording the single "China" for Tori Amos's debut album Little Earthquakes. In 1994, he produced his first full album, the second album Fake by Adorable. His engineering work on the Cure's tenth album Wild Mood Swings led to him producing the band's next album, Bloodflowers, released in 2000. After engineering Placebo's second album Without You I'm Nothing, in 1999 Corkett was invited to produce the band's third album Black Market Music. The early 2000s saw him producing albums for small alternative British bands the Cooper Temple Clause, Biffy Clyro and Queenadreena. In 2012, he teamed up with Love Amongst Ruin frontman Steve Hewitt to engineer albums for French band Lys and Italian band Spiral 69. Corkett often works at Moles Studio in Bath, having recorded albums by Billy No Mates, Queenadreena, Dionysos, Fiction Plane and Love Amongst Ruin there.

Production
 1990 The Heart Throbs – "I See Danger"
 1991 Vera Kaa – Different Ways
 1994 Adorable – Fake
 1995 Sleeper – Smart
 1996 Strangelove – Love and Other Demons
 1997 Strangelove – Strangelove
 1997 Warm Jets – Future Signs
 1998 The Dandys – Symphonic Screams
 2000 Placebo – Black Market Music
 2000 The Cure – Bloodflowers
 2002 The Cooper Temple Clause – See This Through and Leave
 2002 Snuff – Disposable Income
 2002 Biffy Clyro – Blackened Sky
 2005 Queenadreena – The Butcher and the Butterfly
 2005 Fat Cats – Deadbeat
 2007 Fiction Plane – Left Side of the Brain
 2007 Ciam – Anonymous
 2008 Computerclub – Before the Walls Came Down 
 2010 Love Amongst Ruin – Love Amongst Ruin
 2011 Love Amongst Ruin – Acoustic
 2012 The Heavy – The Glorious Dead

Engineer
 1985 ABC – How to Be a ... Zillionaire!
 1985 Uriah Heep – Equator
 1986 The Chameleons – Strange Times
 1986 Twelfth Night – Twelfth Night XII
 1989 Xmal Deutschland – Devils
 1990 Les Maracas – Les Maracas
 1992 Tori Amos – Little Earthquakes
 1992 DNA – Taste This
 1992 Howard Jones – In the Running
 1992 Julian Cope – Jehovahkill
 1992 No. 9 Dream – Let It Come Down!
 1993 Deacon Blue – Whatever You Say, Say Nothing
 1993 The Fat Lady Sings – Johnson
 1993 Tribe – Sleeper
 1993 Björk – Debut
 1994 Juliet Roberts – Natural Thing
 1995 Catherine Wheel – Happy Days
 1996 The Cure – Wild Mood Swings
 1996 Dirty Three – Horse Stories
 1996 Inaura – One Million Smiles
 1997 Nick Cave and the Bad Seeds – The Boatman's Call
 1998 Man With No Name – Earth Moving the Sun
 1998 Six by Seven – The Things We Make
 1998 Placebo – Without You I'm Nothing
 1999 Suede – Head Music
 2000 16 Horsepower – Secret South
 2000 Electrasy – In Here We Fall
 2002 Kaolin – Allez 
 2003 Yat-Kha – Tuva.Rock
 2005 Delays – Faded Seaside Glamour
 2005 The Coral – The Invisible Invasion
 2005 Dionysos – Monsters in Love
 2005 Patrick Duff – Luxury Problems
 2005 Billy No Mates – We Are Legion
 2009 Jennie DeVoe – Fireworks and Karate Supplies
 2006 Seize the Day – The Tide is Turning
 2007 Young Love – Too Young to Fight It
 2007 Grace – Detours
 2009 Jennie DeVoe – Strange Sunshine
 2010 Maika Makovski – Maika Makovski
 2013 Lys – Go Your Own Way
 2013 Spiral69 – Ghosts in My Eyes

Remixes
 1989 Xmal Deutschland – "Dreamland"
 1993 Tribe – "Miracle of Sound"
 1994 Adorable – "Road Movie"
 1997 The Cure – "Mint Car"
 2020 Serpent Ride – "Dance Now"

References

External links
Paul Corkett discography Discogs
Paul Corkett discography AllMusic

British record producers
Living people
Year of birth missing (living people)
British music arrangers
British audio engineers